Pietro "Piero" Pelù (born 10 February 1962) is an Italian singer and songwriter, best known for his work with the Italian band Litfiba. He was born in Florence.

In July 1999, Pelù quit Litfiba. In 2000, he released his first solo album Né buoni né cattivi. In 2002, his duet with an Indonesian popstar, Anggun, entitled "L'amore immaginato" reached No.1 in the National Italian Airplay Charts for over two months. In 2009, Back in Litfiba with historical founder Ghigo Renzulli. In 2013, he appeared as one of the four judges on The Voice of Italy.

He participated at the Sanremo Music Festival 2020 with the song "Gigante".

Discography

Litfiba
Guerra (1982)
Luna/La preda (1983)
Eneide di Krypton (1983)
Yassassin (1984) 
Desaparecido (1985)
Transea (1986)
17 RE (1986)
Live 12-5-87 (Aprite i vostri occhi) (1987, live)
Litfiba 3 (1988)
Pirata (1989)
El Diablo (1990)
Sogno Ribelle (1992)
Terremoto (1993)
Colpo di coda (1994)
Spirito (1994)
Lacio drom (1995)
Mondi Sommersi (1997)
Croce e delizia (1998)
Infinito (1999)
Litfiba Live '99 (2005)
Stato libero di Litfiba (2010 live album +2 songs unpublished)
Grande Nazione (2012)
Trilogia 1983-1989 live 2013 (2013)

Solo
Né buoni né cattivi (2000)
U.D.S. - L'uomo della strada (2002)
Soggetti smarriti (2004)
Presente (2005)
In faccia (2006)
Storytellers (2007)
Fenomeni (2008)
Identikit (2013)
Pugili fragili (2020)

Bibliography
Perfetto difettoso (Arnoldo Mondadori Editore, 2000) 
 Identikit di un ribelle, (Rizzoli Editore, 2014)

References

1962 births
Living people
Musicians from Florence
Italian male singers
Italian rock singers
Italian singer-songwriters